Martha are a rock band from Pity Me, a village in County Durham in the North East of England. After singles on their own Discount Horse label and Odd Box Records, their debut album Courting Strong, was released on Fortuna Pop! and Salinas Records in 2014. As of 2022 they have released four full-length albums on cult UK and US based independent record labels.

They have described themselves as queer, straight edge, vegan and anarchist. They have no designated frontperson and all contribute vocals. Two members of Martha previously founded (and still play in) the band ONSIND, and another lead the band No Ditching.

They have variously cited The Housemartins, Motown, Billy Bragg, The Thermals, Ted Leo, power pop, The Replacements, Heart, The Marked Men, Big Star, Masshysteri, and The Exploding Hearts as influences.

History
Martha formed in the village of Pity Me, a suburb of Durham in the North East of England. Formed by J.C. Cairns (guitar/vocals), Daniel Ellis (guitar/vocals), Naomi Griffin (bass/vocals), and Nathan Stephens-Griffin (drums/vocals) in the early 2010s, they released their self-titled debut EP in February 2012.

A year later they released the "Sycamore"/"Lost Without You" single on their own Discount Horse label. The band played Indietracks festival for the first time in 2013. After releasing a split single with American artist Spoonboy (David Combs of The Max Levine Ensemble) Martha headed to the studio with MJ of Hookworms to record their first album.

Courting Strong was released by Fortuna Pop! in the U.K. and Salinas Records in the U.S. They followed it with more split singles with American bands Benny "The Jet" Rodriguez and Radiator Hospital, a repeat visit to Indietracks and an appearance at Glastonbury Festival.

Their next album Blisters in the Pit of My Heart, also produced by MJ, was issued in mid-2016 by Dirtnap Records in the U.S. and Fortuna Pop! once again in the U.K.

They toured the UK with Radiator Hospital in late 2015, and played a tour of the UK and Ireland with Joyce Manor in July 2017.

In mid to late April and early May 2018 they, along with Bad Moves of Washington, D.C., supported Jeff Rosenstock for the Northeastern and Midwestern leg of his US tour.

On 17 April 2018 Martha, filling in last minute for Yo La Tengo, were the guest band on an episode of The Chris Gethard Show on truTV.

On 13 December 2018 the band released single "Heart Is Healing"; announcing they had signed to Big Scary Monsters in the UK and EU and had a new album following soon. On 28 January 2019 the band unveiled title track "Love Keeps Kicking" as a single. The video for which was the second directed for the band by friends Ben Epstein and David Combs of The Max Levine Ensemble. The band's third album, Love Keeps Kicking, was released on 5 April 2019.

On 28 October 2022 the band released their fourth full-length album Please Don't Take Me Back on Specialist Subject Records in the UK and Dirtnap Records in the US. It was their first album to be released by Specialist Subject, although they had put out a 7" single with them prior. It's also the band's first album to be recorded with Phil Booth at JT Soar in Nottingham, however three tracks from their 2014 split with Spoonboy had been recorded there previously.

Discography

Albums
Courting Strong – Fortuna Pop! (UK) / Salinas (US), 12" LP, CD, MP3 (2014)
Blisters in the Pit of My Heart – Fortuna Pop! (UK) / Dirtnap (US), 12" LP, CD, MP3 (2016)
Love Keeps Kicking – Big Scary Monsters (UK/EU) / Dirtnap (US), 12" LP, CD, MP3 (2019)
Please Don't Take Me Back – Specialist Subject (UK/EU) / Dirtnap (US), 12" LP, CD, Cassette, MP3 (2022)

Extended plays
Martha EP – Discount Horse/Win Htein/Odd Box, Cassette, MP3 (2012) and Tuff Enuff reissue, 7", MP3 (2015)

Singles
"Sycamore"/"Lost Without You" – Discount Horse, 7", MP3 (2013)
"The Winter Fuel Allowance Ineligibility Blues"/"Fix My Brain" (The Marked Men cover) - Fortuna Pop!, 7", MP3 (2017)
"Heart is Healing" – Big Scary Monsters (UK/EU) / Dirtnap (US), MP3 (2018)
"Love Keeps Kicking" – Big Scary Monsters (UK/EU) / Dirtnap (US), MP3 (2019)
"Into This" – Big Scary Monsters (UK/EU) / Dirtnap (US), MP3 (2019)
"Please Don't Take Me Back" – Specialist Subject, 7", MP3 (2022)
"Beat Perpetual" - Dirtnap, 7", MP3 (2022)
"Hope Gets Harder" - Specialist Subject/Dirtnap, MP3 (2022)

Split releases
Split EP with Spoonboy – Nervous Nelly, 7", MP3  (2014)
Split EP with Radiator Hospital – Specialist Subject, 7", MP3 (2015)
Split EP with Benny the Jet Rodriguez – Drunken Sailor, 7", MP3 (2015)

References

External links
Official website
Martha discography at Bandcamp
Discount Horse Records

Underground punk scene in the United Kingdom
British indie pop groups
English pop punk groups
Straight edge groups
Queercore groups
Musical groups from County Durham
Specialist Subject Records artists
Big Scary Monsters Recording Company artists